Paralecta chalarodes is a moth in the family Xyloryctidae. It was described by Edward Meyrick in 1925. It is found on New Guinea.

The wingspan is about 26 mm. The forewings are shining whitish, towards the costa white, and with some scattered dark fuscous specks, a blotch of fuscous suffusion resting on the dorsum before the middle and a pale fuscous shade from the costa at two-thirds to the dorsum at three-fourths, angulated in the middle, darker on the dorsum. There is also a pale fuscous suffusion towards the termen, especially towards the middle, and a darker fuscous suffused streak along the termen. The hindwings are whitish.

References

Paralecta
Taxa named by Edward Meyrick
Moths described in 1925